Taq Hoseyn-e Seyd Hadi (also Romanized as Ţāq Ḩoseyn-e Şeyd Hādī; also known as Ţāq Ḩoseyn) is a village in Hoseyniyeh Rural District, Alvar-e Garmsiri District, Andimeshk County, Khuzestan Province, Iran. At the 2006 census, its population was 20, in 8 families.

References 

Populated places in Andimeshk County